William Bonfield CBE, FREng, FRS (born 6 March 1937) is a British material scientist, and Emeritus Professor of Medical Materials in the University of Cambridge.

Life
He earned a BSc with First Class Honours, and PhD at Imperial College, London.
He was a Senior Research Scientist at the Honeywell Research Center from 1961 to 1968. He taught at Queen Mary College, becoming the Chairman of the School of Engineering, and Dean of Engineering. 
He was Director of the University of London Interdisciplinary Research Centre (IRC) in Biomedical Materials. In 1991 he was awarded the A. A. Griffith Medal and Prize.

He was Professor of Medical Materials, at the University of Cambridge.
He directed the Cambridge Centre for Medical Materials, and the Pfizer Institute of Pharmaceutical Materials Science.

References

External links
William Bonfield on Debrett's People of Today
Cambridge Centre for Medical Materials. William Bonfield is a current group member.
UCL

1937 births
British materials scientists
Alumni of Imperial College London
Academics of Queen Mary University of London
Academics of the University of Cambridge
Fellows of the Royal Society
Fellows of the Royal Academy of Engineering
Living people
Commanders of the Order of the British Empire